Chordeiles is a New World genus of nighthawks in the family Caprimulgidae.  It contains the following species:

 

The genus name Chordeiles is from Ancient Greek khoreia, a dance with music, and deile, "evening".

References

 
Bird genera

Taxonomy articles created by Polbot